Barguzin (Bargajan) is a rural locality (a selo) and the administrative center of Barguzinsky District in the Republic of Buryatia, Russia, located on the left bank of the Barguzin River at the southern end of the Barguzin Valley. Population:

Transportation
The P438 road leads southwest to the selo of Adamovo, the urban-type settlement of Ust-Barguzin, and eventually to Ulan-Ude; it leads northeast along the Barguzin Valley to Ulyun and Kurumkan.

Barguzin is served by the Barguzin Airport.

Climate
Barguzin has a subarctic climate (Köppen climate classification Dwc), with severely cold winters and warm summers. Precipitation is quite low but is significantly higher in July and August than at other times of the year.

References

Rural localities in Barguzinsky District
Transbaikal Oblast